Århus Statsgymnasium is a secondary school and Danish Gymnasium in the neighborhood Hasle in Aarhus, Denmark. The school offers the 3 year Matriculation examination (STX) programme. It was the third Gymnasium to be built in or around Aarhus and the 38th State Gymnasium in country. The school is an independent self-owning institution under the Danish state with about 800 students divided across 30 classes.

Aarhus Municipality and a number of surrounding municipalities took initiative to build the school in the 1950s. In 1958 a group of students from Marselisborg Gymnasium were transferred and the first classes began August 1958, in rented localities until Juni 1959, when construction on the school had completed. The school was managed by the Danish state until 1986 when supervision was handed over to Aarhus County. In 2007 the Danish counties were disbanded and the school has, like most other Danish educational institutions, been self-owning and independent under the state since then. In 1971 Århus Statsgymnasium started a Higher Preparatory Examination (HF) programme which lasted until 1992.

Building 
The building of Aarhus Statsgymnasium is a listed structure. It was the first State Gymnasium to be built as a result of an architectural competition. Only architects from Aarhus County could participate and some 55 submissions entered the contest, eventually won by Johan Richter with a submission incorporating 1950s modernity with elements of 1920s classicism and 1930s functionalism. The Danish state art institution Statens Kunstfond initiated an art project which resulted in a large ceramic installation by Asger Jorn in the foyer.

Programmes 
The Matriculation examination (STX) programme is divided into four programmes; natural sciences, political sciences, linguistics and art each composed of a range of elective choices. The school offers the common languages typically seen in Danish high schools including English, German, French and Spanish.

Notable alumni  
 1972: Anne Linnet
 1979: Elsebeth Egholm
 1983: Henrik Qvortrup
 1993: Cindy Lynn Brown
 1994: Niels Brinck
 1997: Tina Dickow
 1998: Asbjørn Sennels
 2008: Frederik Krabbe

References

External links
 Århus Statsgymnasium

Gymnasiums in Aarhus